Nicholas Day may refer to:

 Saint Nicholas Day, the feast day of St Nicholas
 Nicholas Day (actor) (born 1947), British actor
 Nick Day (statistician) (born 1939), British statistician and cancer epidemiologist
 Nick Day (film director), British born, US-based filmmaker
 Nicolas Day (born 1955), Australian wildlife illustrator